Horsley Park is a suburb of Sydney in the state of New South Wales, Australia. Horsley Park is located 39 kilometres west of the Sydney central business district in the local government area of the City of Fairfield. Horsley Park is part of the Greater Western Sydney region. It is a semi-rural suburb, located 5 km west of Wetherill Park and 11 km north-west of Fairfield.

History
Aboriginal people from the Cabrogal tribe, a sub-group of the Gandangara tribe, have lived in the Fairfield area for over 30 000 years. European settlement began in Fairfield in the early 19th century. Horsley Park was originally part of Colonel George Johnston's  property "Kings Gift", which was given to him by Governor King for his part in putting down the Irish Rebellion at Vinegar Hill in 1804.

After his death it passed to his daughter Blanche who in 1829 married Major George Nicholas Weston. He built an Indian colonial style homestead on the property and named it "Horsley" after his birthplace in Surrey, England. Horsley Homestead is one of the few remaining early colonial buildings in the Fairfield district today protected by The Australian Heritage National Trust.

In 1959, the Horsley Drive (so named because it leads to Horsley Park) opened up as a continuous route from Lansvale. Horsley Park Public School was opened in 1931.

Today, Horsley Park is known to have a rich Italian and Maltese heritage residing. It is also known for being the original location for the formation of Club Marconi.

Heritage listings 
Horsley Park has a number of heritage-listed sites, including:
 52-58 Jamieson Close: Horsley complex

Population
At the 2016 census, there were 1,837 residents in Horsley Park. 63.6% of people were born in Australia with the next top countries of birth being Italy 7.5%, Malta 6.5% and Iraq 2.2%. 53.4% of people spoke only English at home. Other languages spoken at home included Italian 12.3%, Maltese 9.0% and Assyrian Neo-Aramaic 3.9%. Catholicism was the top religious affiliation, with 61.9% of people stating they were Catholic.

Commercial area
There are a number of small farms in the area. A small group of shops is located on the main street, The Horsley Drive, including a grocer, lolly shop, newsagent and firearms store. Carlo's Supa IGA opened in 2011 on Horsley Rd. There is also the piety store located in the our lady of victories parish Church, where many religious artefacts can be purchased, such as statues and the annual chocolate pascal lamb, introduced by the Michaelite order of priests who took over the declining Paulist missionaries.  The IGA Store also includes a liquor section.

Schools
Horsley Park contains three schools:

Marion Catholic Primary School (conjoined with the local Catholic Church) 
Horsley Park Public School (which has been servicing the area since the 1930s)
St Narsai Assyrian Christian College (which relocated to the area in January 2018)

Churches
Horsley Park is Australia's "most god-fearing suburb", with 97% professing religious belief, mostly Catholic. 

Churches located in Horsley Park include: 
 Our Lady of Victories Catholic Church, known for its Good Friday Procession
 Spanish Community Bible Church
 Horsley Park Christian Church (also known as Chung Chen Chinese Christian Church), founded by Chinese refugees from East Timor, and located in Horsley Park since 12 November 2000

Transport
The Westlink M7 motorway runs through Horsley Park. Bus route 813 operate between Horsley Park shops on the Horsley Drive and the Fairfield interchange

Climate

See also
Western Sydney Parklands, a large parkland situated in the suburb.

References

Suburbs of Sydney
City of Fairfield